Middle Plantation is a  historic house and plantation in Davidsonville, Maryland, originally owned by the Huguenot, Mareen Duvall.  The original 600-acre tract was patented to him near the South River in 1664.

Middle Plantation was described shortly after it was built "as luxurious and courtly as any of the manors of the English gentry."

The plantation is identified by a historical marker.

References

Houses in Anne Arundel County, Maryland
Huguenot history in the United States
Plantations in Maryland
Plantation houses in Maryland
Duvall family
1664 establishments in Maryland